is a physicist at the International Center for Materials Nanoarchitectonics (MANA), National Institute for Materials Science (NIMS), Japan. He is an authority and leading researcher in nanotechnology in the area of energy states of single wall carbon nanotubes (SWCN).
His research is notable for the edge effects of the nanographene materials, which is a part of the single layer graphene. He obtained his Ph.D. in 2000 from University of Tsukuba in Japan. From 2000 to 2009 he was an assistant professor at Department of Quantum Matter in Hiroshima University, Japan. From 2009, he is an Independent Scientist at International Center for Materials Nanoarchitectonics (WPI-MANA), National Institute for Materials Science (NIMS) in Tsukuba, Japan. Beside the above primary research position, he was a visiting scholar at ETH-Zurich, Switzerland from 2003 to 2005, also had a concurrent position as PRESTO researcher in Japan Science and Technology Agency (JST).

Representative publications
 
 
 
 
 
 
 Katsunori Wakabayashi, "Low-Energy Physical Properties of Edge States in Nano-Carbon Systems", in Springer Series in Solid State Physics, vol. 156, S.N. Kamakar et al. eds., 
 Katsunori Wakabayashi, Electronic and Magnetic Properties of Nanographite, p. 279–304, Carbon-based Magnetism – An overview of the magnetism of metal free carbon-based compounds and materials edited by T. Makarova, F. Palacio, (Elsevier, 2006). .

Award
The original paper of graphene edge state and graphene nanoribbons was awarded the JPS Best Paper Award in March 2003 from the Physical Society of Japan. He has been awarded the commendation of ministry of education, culture, sports, science and technology (MEXT), Japan in 2010 for the contribution of pioneering works on theoretical research of nanoscale effect on electronic properties of graphene. In 2017, he has been awarded the JSPS Prize from Japan Society for the Promotion of Science (JSPS).

See also
Graphene oxide paper
Carbon nanotubes
Mitsutaka Fujita

References

External links
English website

Japanese physicists
Japanese nanotechnologists
Living people
University of Tsukuba alumni
Year of birth missing (living people)